Many musical genres are particular to some geographical region or to an ethnic, religious or linguistic group.

Cultural genres

By ethnicity or origin 
Ainu
Indigenous Australian
Maori
Palestinian
Russian
Ukrainian

Immigrant communities 

African American
Anglo-American
White Australian
Cajun and Louisiana Creole
Caribbean-British
Immigrants to Australia
Immigrants to the United States
Indian-British
Indo-Caribbean
Irish- and Scottish-Canadian
Irish- and Scottish-American
Latino-American
Tex-Mex and Tejano

International ethnic groups 
Afro-American (also Afro-Latin and Afro-Caribbean)
Andean
Arabic
Assyrian
Basque
Bedouin
Berber
Celtic
Garifuna
Korean
Kurd
Jewish
Secular
Sephardic
Lao
Maroon
Native American and First Nations
Nordic
Romani
Sami

Native Sub-Saharan African ethnic groups 

Baganda
Ewe
Hausa
Igbo
Ndebele
Pygmy
Shona
Sotho
Swazi
Tswana
Wolof
Xhosa
Yoruba
Zulu

Native American ethnic groups 

Arapaho
Blackfoot
Dene
Iroquois
Innu
Inuit
Kiowa
Kwakiutl
Navajo
Pueblo (Hopi, Zuni)
Seminole
Sioux (Lakota, Dakota)
Yaqui
Yuman

Indigenous Caribbean, Mexican, South and Central American people 

Maya

By religion 

Buddhism
Christianity
Anglicanism and Episcopalianism
Amish
Latter-Day Saints
Orthodox
Greek Orthodox
Salvation Army
Shakers
Hare Krishna
Hinduism
Judaism
Islam
Native American religion
Neopaganism
Rastafari movement
Shinto
Sikhism
Taoism
Zoroastrianism

See also: Music of Vatican City

By language 
Esperanto
Portuguese

Geographic genres

By country 
Afghanistan
Albania
Algeria
Andorra
Angola
Antigua and Barbuda
Argentina
Armenia
Australia
Austria
Azerbaijan
Bahamas
Bahrain
Bangladesh
Barbados
Belarus
Belgium
Belize
Benin
Bhutan
Bolivia
Bosnia and Herzegovina
Botswana
Brazil
Brunei
Bulgaria
Burkina Faso
Cambodia
Cameroon
Canada
Cape Verde
Central African Republic
Chad
Chile
China
Colombia
Comoros
Congo-Kinshasa
Congo-Brazzaville
Costa Rica
Côte d'Ivoire
Croatia
Cuba
Cyprus
Czech Republic
Denmark
Djibouti
Dominica
Dominican Republic
East Timor
Ecuador
Egypt
El Salvador
Equatorial Guinea
Eritrea
Estonia
Ethiopia
Fiji
Finland
France
Gabon
Gambia
Georgia
Germany
Ghana
Greece
Grenada
Guatemala
Guinea
Guinea-Bissau
Guyana
Haiti
Honduras
Hong Kong
Hungary
Iceland
India
Indonesia
Iran
Iraq
Ireland
Israel
Italy
Jamaica
Japan
Jordan
Kazakhstan
Kenya
Kiribati
Kosovo
Kuwait
Kyrgyzstan
Laos
Latvia
Lebanon
Lesotho
Liberia
Libya
Liechtenstein
Lithuania
Luxembourg
Macedonia
Madagascar
Malawi
Malaysia
Maldives
Mali
Malta
Marshall Islands
Mauritania
Mauritius
Mexico
Federated States of Micronesia
Moldova
Monaco
Mongolia
Montenegro
Morocco
Mozambique
Myanmar
Namibia
Nauru
Nepal
Netherlands
New Zealand
Nicaragua
Niger
Nigeria
North Korea
Norway
Oman
Pakistan
Palau
Palestine
Panama
Papua New Guinea
Paraguay
Peru
Philippines
Poland
Portugal
Qatar
Romania
Russia
Rwanda
Saint Kitts and Nevis
Saint Lucia
Saint Vincent and the Grenadines
Samoa
San Marino
São Tomé and Príncipe
Saudi Arabia
Senegal
Serbia
Seychelles
Sierra Leone
Singapore
Slovakia
Slovenia
Solomon Islands
Somalia
South Africa
South Korea
Spain
Sri Lanka
Sudan
Suriname
Swaziland
Sweden
Switzerland
Syria
Taiwan
Tajikistan
Tanzania
Thailand
Togo
Tonga
Trinidad and Tobago
Tunisia
Turkey
Turkmenistan
Tuvalu
Uganda
Ukraine
United Arab Emirates
United Kingdom
United States
Uruguay
Uzbekistan
Vanuatu
Vatican City
Venezuela
Vietnam
Western Sahara
Yemen
Zambia
Zimbabwe

By continent or other international region 
Africa
Asia
Caribbean
Central America
Central Asia
East Asia
Eastern Europe
Lesser Antilles
Low Countries
Melanesia
Micronesia
Middle East
North Africa
Northern Europe
Oceania
Polynesia
South Asia
Southeast Asia
Southeastern Europe
West Africa

By province, region or other sub-national entity

Algeria 
Kabylie

Australia 
Adelaide
Brisbane
Canberra
Perth
Sydney

Austria 

Innsbruck
Vienna

Bulgaria 

Thrace

Canada 
Cities:

Montreal
Vancouver

Regions:

Maritime Provinces
Prairie Provinces
West

Provinces and Territories:

Alberta
British Columbia
Manitoba
New Brunswick
Newfoundland and Labrador
Northwest Territories
Nova Scotia
Nunavut
Ontario
Prince Edward Island
Quebec
Saskatchewan
Yukon

Chile 
Easter Island

China 
Anhui
Fujian
Gansu
Guangdong
Guangxi
Guizhou
Hebei
Heilongjiang
Henan
Hong Kong
Hubei
Inner Mongolia
Jiangxi
Jilin
Macau
Manchuria
Qinghai
Shaanxi
Sichuan
Tibet
Xinjiang
Yunnan

Denmark 
Overseas:

Faroe Islands
Greenland

Finland 
Åland
Karelia

France 
Cities

Monaco
Paris

Regions

Aquitaine
Auvergne
Brittany
Burgundy
Corsica
Gascony
Limousin

Overseas:

Austral Islands
French Guiana
French Polynesia
Martinique and Guadeloupe
Mayotte
New Caledonia
Réunion
Tahiti
Wallis and Futuna

Germany 
Cities

Berlin

Greece 
Aegean Islands
Crete
Cyclades
Dodecanese Islands
Epirus
Ionian Islands
Lesbos
Macedonia
Peloponnesos
Thessaloniki
Thessaly
Thrace

Hungary 
Budapest
Pécs

India 
Andaman and Nicobar Islands
Andhra Pradesh
Arunachal Pradesh
Assam
Bengal
Bihar
Chhattisgarh
Goa
Gujarat
Haryana
Himachal Pradesh
Jammu
Jharkhand
Karnataka
Kashmir
Kerala
Madhya Pradesh
Maharashtra
Manipur
Meghalaya
Mizoram
Nagaland
Orissa
Punjab
Rajasthan
Sikkim
Tamil Nadu
Tripura
Uttar Pradesh
Uttaranchal

Indonesia 
Bali
Java
Sumatra

Israel 

Mizrahi Music

Italy 
Regions:
Aosta Valley
Calabria
Campania
Friuli
Latium
Liguria
Lombardy
Marche
Piedmont
Puglia
Sardinia
Sicily
Trentino-Alto Adige/Südtirol
Tuscany
Veneto

Cities:

Florence
Genoa
Lucca
Milan
Naples
Venice

Japan 

Okinawa

Mexico 

Chihuahua

Netherlands 
Overseas:

Aruba and the Netherlands Antilles

New Zealand 
Overseas:

Cook Islands
Niue
Tokelau

Portugal 

Madeira

Romania 

Transylvania

Russia 
Cities:

Kaliningrad
Rostov-on-Don

Regions:

Adygea
Altai
Astrakhan
Bashkortostan
Buryatia
Dagestan
Evenkia
Ingushetia
Irkutsk
Kaliningrad
Kalmykia
Karelia
Khakassia
Mordovia
Nenetsia
Ossetia
Sakha
Tatarstan
Tuva
Udmurtia

Serbia 

Vojvodina

Spain 
Andalusia
Aragon
Balearic Islands
Basque Country
Canary Islands
Castile, Madrid and Leon
Catalonia
Extremadura
Galicia, Cantabria and Asturias
Madrid
Murcia
Navarre and La Rioja
Valencia

Taiwan 
Taiwan

Tajikistan 
Badakhshan

Turkey 

Thrace
Karadeniz

United Kingdom 
Individual countries
England
Cornwall
Northumbria
Somerset
Northern Ireland
Scotland
Wales

Cities:

Birmingham
Classical music of Birmingham
Jazz of Birmingham
Popular music of Birmingham
Cardiff
Liverpool
Manchester

Dependencies and Territories:

Anguilla
Bermuda
Cayman Islands
Channel Islands
Falkland Islands
Gibraltar
Isle of Man
Montserrat
Saint Helena
Turks and Caicos Islands
Virgin Islands

United States 
Regions:

Appalachia
Mid-Atlantic
West

Cities:

Annapolis
Athens
Atlanta
Austin
Baltimore
Charlotte
Chicago
Dallas
Denver
Detroit
Fort Worth
Los Angeles
Miami
Milwaukee
New Orleans
New York City
Olympia
Omaha
Philadelphia
San Diego
San Francisco
Seattle
Washington, D.C.

States:

Alabama
Alaska
Arizona
Arkansas
California
Colorado
Connecticut
Delaware
Florida
Georgia
Hawaii
Idaho
Illinois
Indiana
Iowa
Kansas
Kentucky
Louisiana
Maine
Maryland
Massachusetts
Michigan
Minnesota
Mississippi
Missouri
Montana
Nebraska
Nevada
New Hampshire
New Jersey
New Mexico
New York
North Carolina
North Dakota
Ohio
Oklahoma
Oregon
Pennsylvania
Rhode Island
South Carolina
South Dakota
Tennessee
Texas
Utah
Vermont
Virginia
Washington
West Virginia
Wisconsin
Wyoming

Overseas:

American Samoa
Guam
Mariana Islands
Puerto Rico
Virgin Islands

Historical genres 

Byzantine
Early
Ancient Celtic
Ancient Egypt
Ancient Greek
Ancient India
Hittite
Maya
Medieval (Europe)
Mesopotamia
Ottoman
Ancient Persia
Prehistoric
Renaissance (Europe)
Ancient Rome
Sasanian Empire
Soviet Union
Ancient Sumeria
Temperance songs
Ancient Tamil

See also 
 List of basic music topics
 Lists by country
 List of national anthems

Lists of music genres